Ruperto Toppin (born December 7, 1941 in Panama City, Panama) is a former professional baseball player. He was a right-handed pitcher who appeared in two Major League games for the  Kansas City Athletics, although his professional career lasted a full decade (1960–1969).

Toppin's two MLB appearances, both in relief, came within four days of each other in the middle of the 1962 season.  He pitched a scoreless inning against the Baltimore Orioles on July 28, allowing only one hit, a single to Dave Nicholson, who was then erased on a double play. Then, on August 1, Toppin allowed no hits in one total inning pitched against the Detroit Tigers—but surrendered five bases on balls and three earned runs.  In that game, he came to bat for the only time in his big-league career, and singled off Howie Koplitz for a perfect career 1.000 batting average.

In two big-league innings pitched, Toppin struck out one, walked five, and allowed only the hit to Nicholson.  His earned run average 13.50.

References

External links
Baseball-Reference.com Career Stats
 Major League Baseballs Connection To Gamboa Santa Cruz Canal Zone

1941 births
Living people
Albuquerque Dukes players
Binghamton Triplets players
Birmingham Barons players
Buffalo Bisons (minor league) players
Burlington Senators players
Daytona Beach Islanders players
Hawaii Islanders players
Kansas City Athletics players
Lewiston Broncs players
Major League Baseball pitchers
Major League Baseball players from Panama
Panamanian expatriate baseball players in the United States
Pensacola Senators players
Portland Beavers players
Sarasota Sun Sox players
Savannah Senators players
Sportspeople from Panama City
York White Roses players